Marcel Ivanusa (born January 16, 1985) is a Slovenian professional footballer who plays for Stuttgarter Kickers.

External links

1985 births
Living people
Slovenian footballers
Stuttgarter Kickers II players
Stuttgarter Kickers players
People from Ptuj
3. Liga players
Association football midfielders